Thomas de Hibernia (fl. 1270) was an Irish theologian.
 
Said to be a native of Palmerstown, County Kildare, he became a Franciscan, and Fellow of Sorbonne, Paris. In later life, he moved to Italy, dying ca. 1296 in the "Convent of Aquila, in the Province of Penin."
 
On his death-bed he bequeathed his books and papers to the Sorbonne, "together with six pounds for the purpose of purchasing a rent to celebrate his anniversary."

Lampen, a Franciscan, argues that Thomas Palmeranus, Thomas Hibernicus and Thomas Palmerstonus are the same person.

References

Lampen OFM, Willibrord, "Thomas Palmeranus." In Lexikon für Theologie und Kirche, Freiburg, 1965. vol. 10; col. 146.

Select bibliography

 De Christiana Religione
 De Illusionibus Daemonum
 Manipulus florum, seu Sententiae Patrum (ca. 1480/1494); also published under different titles (Polyanthea novissima (1758) / Thesaurus Patrum (1823) / Dictionarium omnium pene Patrum artque Doctorum (1846) / Flores Doctorum (1858));
 De Flores Bibliae (1568)
 Religio munda (1496; attributed to him)

External links
 http://www.libraryireland.com/biography/ThomasHibernicus.php
https://www.ustc.ac.uk/results?qa=0,0,thomas%20hibernicus,AND&qo=0,0,1&qp=1&qso=11

People from County Kildare
Irish Friars Minor
13th-century Irish Roman Catholic priests
Irish Roman Catholic theologians
Irish expatriates in France
Irish expatriates in Italy
13th-century Irish writers
Franciscan theologians
Irish Latinists